Edwin Ruthvin Reynolds (February 16, 1816 – July 4, 1908) was a U.S. Representative from New York.

Biography
Born in Fort Ann, New York, he was son of Linus J. Reynolds (1790-1838) and Alice (Baker) Reynolds.

Linus Reynolds was the editor and publisher of the Northern Spectator newspaper in Poultney (town), Vermont, and Edwin Reynolds was an apprentice printer at the Spectator at the same time as Horace Greeley.

Edwin Reynolds graduated from Brown University and taught school. He was principal of Albion Academy in Barre, Orleans County, New York for six years. He was county school superintendent from 1843 to 1845.

He studied law, was admitted to the bar in 1843 and practiced in Albion. Reynolds served in local offices, including Justice of the Peace and Clerk of the Orleans County Board of Supervisors.

Reynolds was elected as a Republican to the Thirty-sixth Congress, filling the vacancy caused by the death of Silas M. Burroughs and served from December 5, 1860, to March 3, 1861.

During the American Civil War, Reynolds was a member of the committee which oversaw recruiting and enlistment for the Union Army in Orleans County.

Reynolds was Orleans County Judge and Surrogate Judge from 1864 to 1868, afterwards resuming the practice of law.

He was a presidential elector in 1869 and cast his ballot for Ulysses S. Grant. He supported Horace Greeley for president in 1872.

He died in Albion on July 4, 1908, and was interred in Mount Albion Cemetery.

References

External links

Edwin R. Reynolds at The Political Graveyard

1816 births
1908 deaths
Brown University alumni
People from Fort Ann, New York
People from Albion, Orleans County, New York
New York (state) lawyers
New York (state) state court judges
Republican Party members of the United States House of Representatives from New York (state)
19th-century American politicians
19th-century American judges